Jimmy Dominique Jacky Juan (born 10 June 1983 in Valence, Drôme) is a French former professional footballer who played as a midfielder.

Career
Juan began his career with AS Monaco and  played in a Champions League match against Liverpool in 2004 before spending the 2005–06 season on loan at English Championship club Ipswich Town.

He was sent on loan to Châteauroux in 2008, making 19 appearances in total.

In December 2011, Juan signed for Chesterfield on a deal which lasted until the end of the season. He wore the number 22 shirt. Despite scoring on his debut against Leyton Orient he was beset by injury problems during his time with Chesterfield and was released by the club at the end of the 2011–12 season.

On 6 June 2012, he signed for newly promoted French Ligue 2 side Chamois Niortais.

Career statistics
Source:

References

External links

1983 births
Living people
Sportspeople from Valence, Drôme
Footballers from Auvergne-Rhône-Alpes
French footballers
Association football midfielders
AS Monaco FC players
Ipswich Town F.C. players
Grenoble Foot 38 players
LB Châteauroux players
Chesterfield F.C. players
Chamois Niortais F.C. players
ÉFC Fréjus Saint-Raphaël players
Ligue 1 players
Ligue 2 players
English Football League players
French expatriate sportspeople in Monaco
French expatriate sportspeople in England
Expatriate footballers in Monaco
Expatriate footballers in England